Rel is an American television sitcom created by Lil Rel Howery and Kevin Barnett for the Fox Broadcasting Company. The series also stars Jordan L. Jones, Jess Hilarious and Sinbad. Loosely based on Howery's own life, it follows a Chicago man trying to rebuild his life after his ex-wife slept with his barber.

Rel is a joint production by Morningside Entertainment, REL Event Productions, Scully Productions, JMMLG, Bird Luger, and 20th Century Fox Television and syndicated by 20th Television. On April 17, 2019, Fox canceled the series after one season.

Plot summary
The series centers on Rel, a nurse living on the West Side of Chicago, whose life is soon disrupted when his wife is having an affair with his own barber and divorces him.

Cast
Lil Rel Howery as Rel, a nurse who tries to rebuild his life after the divorce
Jordan L. Jones as Nat, Rel's younger brother who just got out of jail
Jess Hilarious as Brittany, Rel's best friend
Sinbad as Milton, Rel's and Nat's widowed father.

Episodes

Kevin Barnett 
Co-creator Kevin Barnett, who also worked on the show Broad City died at the age of 32 on January 22, 2019. His death in Tijuana, Baja California, Mexico, while he was on vacation, was caused by pancreatitis. Barnett co-hosted a podcast, Roundtable of Gentlemen.

Reception

Critical response
On the review aggregation website Rotten Tomatoes, the series holds a 44% approval rating with an average rating of 4.36 out of 10, based on 16 reviews. The website's critical consensus reads, "Rel has a talented star supported by a solid ensemble, but none of it's enough to disguise an ordinary sitcom that hits a series of generic beats." Metacritic, which uses a weighted average, assigned a score of 46 out of 100 based on 6 critics, indicating "mixed or average reviews".

Ratings

Notes

References

External links
Official Site

 Rel on Instagram

2010s American black sitcoms
2018 American television series debuts
2019 American television series endings
English-language television shows
Fox Broadcasting Company original programming
Television series by 20th Century Fox Television
Television shows set in Chicago